Perth was a constituency of the House of Commons of the Parliament of the United Kingdom from 1832 to 1918, 1918 to 1950, and 1997 to 2005. From 1832 to 1918 it was a burgh constituency. From 1918 to 1950, and 1997 to 2005, it was a county constituency. During each of the three periods it elected one Member of Parliament (MP).

Boundaries

Boundaries 1832 to 1918 

As created by the Representation of the People (Scotland) Act 1832, and first used in the 1832 general election, the constituency included the burgh of Perth and was one of two constituencies covering the county of Perth. The other was the Perthshire constituency (except that five detached parishes of the county were within the Clackmannanshire and Kinross-shire constituency).

The boundaries of the constituency, as set out in the Representation of the People (Scotland) Act 1832, were-

"From the North-western Corner of the North Inch, on the Right Bank of the River Tay, in a straight Line to the Bridge on the Mill Lead at the Boot of Balhousie; thence in a straight Line to the Bridge on the Glasgow Road over the Scouring Burn; thence in a straight Line to the Southern Corner of the Water Reservoir of the Dept; thence in a straight Line to the Southern Corner of the Friarton Pier on the River Tay; thence across the River Tay (passing to the South of the Friarton Island) to the Point at which the same is met by the Boundary of the respective Parishes of Kinfauns and Kinnoul; thence, Northward, along the Boundary of the Parish of Kinfauns to the Point at which the several Boundaries of the Properties of Kinfauns, Kinnoul, and Barnhill meet; thence in a straight Line to the North-eastern Corner of Lord Kinnoul's Lodge, at the Gate of Approach to Kinnoul Hill; thence in a straight Line to the North-eastern Corner of the Enclosure of the Lunatic Asylum; thence in a straight Line to the Point at which the Annatty Burn crosses the Blairgowrie Road; thence down the Annatty Burn to the Point at which the same joins the River Tay; thence in a straight Line to the Point first described."

Prior to the 1832 general election, the county (including the detached parishes) had been covered by the Perthshire constituency and Perth Burghs. Perth Burghs consisted of the burgh of Perth and burghs in the county of Fife and the county of Forfar.

The 1832 boundaries of the Perth constituency were used also in the general elections of 1835, 1837, 1841, 1847, 1852, 1857, 1859, 1865, 1868, 1874 and 1880.

The Redistribution of Seats Act 1885 divided the Perthshire constituency to create Eastern Perthshire and Western Perthshire. There was no change to the boundaries of the Perth constituency. Therefore, the 1832 boundaries of the Perth constituency were used again in the general elections of 1885, 1886, 1892, 1895, 1900, 1906, January 1910 and December 1910.

Boundaries 1918 to 1950 

By 1918 county boundaries had been redefined under the Local Government (Scotland) Act 1889 and, in creating new constituency boundaries, the Representation of the People Act 1918 took account of new local government boundaries. The Perth constituency became one of two county constituencies covering the county of Perth and the county of Kinross, and was first used as such in the 1918 general election. The other constituency was Kinross and West Perthshire.

The Perth constituency was defined as consisting of the burghs of Abernethy, Alyth, Blairgowrie, Coupar Angus, Perth, and Rattray in the county of Perth and the Blairgowrie and Perth districts of the county, and the same boundaries were used for the general elections of 1922, 1923, 1924, 1929, 1931, 1935 and 1945.

For the 1950 general election the constituency was replaced by the Perth and East Perthshire constituency, which was defined by the House of Commons (Redistribution of Seats) Act 1949 to have exactly the same boundaries as the former Perth constituency.

1997 to 2005 

For the 1997 general election Perth was recreated, and was a constituency entirely within the Perth and Kinross council area, which had been established the year before, under the Local Government etc (Scotland) Act 1994. The council area was otherwise covered by North Tayside to the north, which also covered part of the Angus council area, Angus to the east, which also covered part of the Angus council area and part of the Dundee City council area, and Ochil to the south, which also covered the Clackmannanshire council area and part of the Stirling council area.

The same boundaries were used for the 2001 general election.

For the 2005 general election, the Perth constituency was largely replaced by Ochil and South Perthshire, covering the Clackmannanshire council area and a southern portion of the Perth and Kinross council area. Perth and North Perthshire was created to cover the rest of the Perth and Kinross council area.

Constituency profile

Members of Parliament

MPs 1832–1918

MPs 1918–1950

MPs 1997–2005

Election results

1832 to 1918 

Kinnaird's resignation caused a by-election.

Maule was appointed Secretary at War, requiring a by-election.

Maule was appointed President of the Board of Control, requiring a by-election.

Maule succeeded to the peerage, becoming Lord Panmure and causing a by-election.

Kinnaird succeeded to the peerage, becoming Lord Kinnaird.

1918 to 1950

1930s

1940s

1997 to 2005

Notes and references 

Politics of Perth and Kinross
Historic parliamentary constituencies in Scotland (Westminster)
Constituencies of the Parliament of the United Kingdom established in 1832
Constituencies of the Parliament of the United Kingdom disestablished in 1950
Constituencies of the Parliament of the United Kingdom established in 1997
Constituencies of the Parliament of the United Kingdom disestablished in 2005